The Committee of Fifteen was a New York City citizens' group that lobbied for the elimination of prostitution and gambling. It was established in November 1900. The Committee hired investigators who visited city locations where prostitution and gambling was alleged to have taken place and filed reports on each site. The investigators visited bars, pool halls, dance halls, and tenements during the year 1901. The investigators posed as clients to determine the locations where prostitution took place.

The Committee disbanded in 1901 after evaluating the investigations and reporting to Governor Benjamin Barker Odell, Jr. It was succeeded by the Committee of Fourteen. In 1902 the Committee of Fifteen's report, The Social Evil With Special Reference to Conditions Existing in the City of New York was released.

Members in 1901

William H. Baldwin, Jr. (Chairman)
Edwin R. A. Seligman (Secretary)
Charles Stewart Smith
Joel B. Erhardt
John Stewart Kennedy
Felix Adler
George Haven Putnam
Charles Sprague Smith
George Foster Peabody
Jacob H. Schiff
Andrew J. Smith
Austen G. Fox
William J. O'Brien
Alexander E. Orr
John Harsen Rhoades

References

Further reading
Committee of Fifteen Records, 1900–1901. Compiled by Melanie Yolles. New York: Manuscripts and Archives Section, New York Public Library

Prostitution in New York (state)
Organizations based in New York City
1900 establishments in New York City
1901 disestablishments in New York (state)
Organizations established in 1900
Organizations disestablished in 1901